Bruno Fernando Nunes (born 8 July 1990), known as Bruno Nunes, is a Brazilian professional footballer who plays for Paraná Clube as a forward.

In 29 June 2016, Bruno Nunes signed a three-year-deal with Marítimo.

In the Spring of 2019 he joined South Korean Club Jeonnam Dragons.

References

External links

1991 births
Living people
Sportspeople from Pernambuco
Brazilian footballers
Association football forwards
Campeonato Brasileiro Série A players
Campeonato Brasileiro Série B players
Campeonato Brasileiro Série C players
Rio Preto Esporte Clube players
Associação Atlética Ponte Preta players
Mogi Mirim Esporte Clube players
Oeste Futebol Clube players
Associação Desportiva Recreativa e Cultural Icasa players
Mirassol Futebol Clube players
Jeonnam Dragons players
Associação Portuguesa de Desportos players
North American Soccer League players
Fort Lauderdale Strikers players
K League 2 players
Brazilian expatriate footballers
Brazilian expatriate sportspeople in the United States
Brazilian expatriate sportspeople in South Korea
Expatriate soccer players in the United States
Expatriate footballers in South Korea